The Church of Jesus Christ of Latter-day Saints in Togo refers to the Church of Jesus Christ of Latter-day Saints (LDS Church) and its members in Togo. A small group was formed in 1997 which developed into a branch in 1999. In 2021, there were 5,997 members in 23 congregations.

History 

Dieudonné Attiogbe became a member of the LDS Church in 1989, while he and his father lived in England. After returning home, he found the LDS Church was not in Togo. He sent letters to church headquarters in South Africa who then sent a letter to Salt Lake City asking if a group could be organized. Dieudonné Attiogbe was given tentative permission to organize a group and was given a list of 70 individuals that were baptized abroad and had returned to Togo. On July 15, 1997, James O. Mason, who was serving as president of the church's Africa Area organized the Lome Togo group, with Agnon Ameri Didier as presiding elder.

On February 19, 1999, Togo came under the stewardship of the church's Ivory Coast Abidjan Mission, and the first missionary couple, Demoine A. and Joyce Findlay, began missionary work in Togo. Three days later on February 21, 1999, the Lomé Branch, the first in Togo, was organized with Dieudonné Attiogbe as branch president. Seminary and institute commenced that same year. Legal recognition for the LDS Church was granted in July 2000. Lomé Branch's first conference was held December 17, 2000. In 2009, the church's first district was organized in Lomé. On December 8, 2013, the Lomé Togo Stake, the first in Togo, was organized. A second stake was organized in Lomé in 2017.

The LDS Church conducted several humanitarian and development projects in Togo between 1985 and 2019 which included community projects, vaccination initiates, newborn and prenatal care, and wheelchair donations.

Stakes 
As of February 2023, Togo had the following stakes and congregations:

Stake de Lomé Togo Be (Lomé Togo Be Stake)
Ablogame Ward
Adakpame Ward
Akodessewa Ward
Anfame Ward
Attiegou Ward
Baguida Ward
Be-Kpota 1st Ward
Be-Kpota 2nd Ward
Souzanetime Ward
Kodjoviakope Branch
Kpogan Branch

Stake de Lomé Togo Tokoin (Lomé Togo Tokoin Stake)
Apedokoe Ward
Doumassesse Ward
Hédzranawoé Ward
Kélegougan Ward
Tokoin Ward
Wuiti Ward
Adidogome Branch
Agoe Nyive Branch
Djagble Branch
Sanguéra Branch

Congregations directly administered by the Benin Cotonou Mission include:
Kpalime Branch
Tabligbo Branch
Tsevie Branch
Benin Cotonau Mission Branch

The branch of the Benin Cotonou Mission serves church members not in proximity to a meetinghouse, and is not part of a stake or district. Congregations not within a stake are named branches, regardless of size.

Missions
Togo was assigned to the Ivory Coast Mission in 1999. Shortly after, the Ivory Coast Mission was renamed the Ivory Coast Abidjan Mission to meet the church's mission naming guidelines. The Ghana Cape Coast Mission was organized on 1 July 2005, of which Benin was a part. On July 1, 2011, the Benin Cotonou Mission was created. The mission covers the countries of Benin and Togo.

Temples
There are no temples in Togo. Togo is currently located in the Accra Ghana Temple district.

See also

Religion in Togo

References

External links
 The Church of Jesus Christ of Latter-day Saints - Africa West Area
 ComeUntoChrist.org Latter-day Saints Visitor site

 
Christianity in Togo